The Castlebar Song Contest was an annual international song contest that was first staged in 1966 in Castlebar, County Mayo, Ireland. The contest was initially organised by the Castlebar Chamber of Commerce as part of a drive to increase tourism to the town. It was hoped that the competition would produce a song that would make the town famous, just as songs such as The Rose of Tralee, Galway Bay, or Mary from Dungloe had done for their respective towns. The first contest had 70 entries from the UK and Ireland, and the final was hosted by Gay Byrne. The winning song bore the Irish version of the town's name - Caisleán A' Bharraigh.

Information
After the first contest, the emphasis changed from finding a song named after the town to one of promoting the town through attracting composers, of various genres, from all over the world to the town. This strategy was successful and the town (and some of the neighbouring towns) were thronged with contest participants for the first week of October for the remainder of the contest's life. From humble beginnings with a mere £50 in prizes, the event grew in status to a point where its prize money at £20,000 was bettered only by the Yamaha Song Contest in Japan.

In 1981, the future of the song contest became political when it was debated in Dáil Éireann.

Broadcast
In 1970, the contest was recorded for television by RTÉ (the national television station) and transmitted on the following Sunday. The 1971 and 1973 contests were similarly recorded and shown later. However, the 1974 contest was broadcast live from the Old Royal Ballroom and Theatre and Travellers Friend Hotel in Castlebar nationally on RTÉ. Apart from 1987, when there was no contest, the event enjoyed live television coverage from 1974 until the event finished in 1988. James Haldane O'Hare was the TV Designer for RTÉ for the majority of the broadcasts

Winners

External links
 Photo collection of Mayo Library

References

Song contests
Irish music
Music festivals in Ireland
Castlebar
Recurring events disestablished in 1966
1966 establishments in Ireland
1988 disestablishments in Ireland
Castlebar Song Contest winners